Ronny Ernst (born 7 May 1976) is a German former professional footballer who played as a right-back.

References

External links

 Ronny Ernst at kleeblatt-chronik.de 

1976 births
Living people
Footballers from Dresden
Association football fullbacks
German footballers
Germany under-21 international footballers
Dynamo Dresden II players
Dynamo Dresden players
TSV 1860 Munich players
TSV 1860 Munich II players
SpVgg Greuther Fürth players
SV Waldhof Mannheim players
Dresdner SC players
Rot-Weiss Essen players
Rot-Weiß Oberhausen players
SV 19 Straelen players
Bundesliga players
2. Bundesliga players